Ghunaim may refer to:
 Zuhair Ghunaim
 Zakaria Goneim